William Joseph McCulloch (7 November 1872 – 3 September 1951) was an Australian rules footballer who played with Melbourne and Collingwood in the Victorian Football League (VFL).

References

External links 

1872 births
1951 deaths
Australian rules footballers from Melbourne
Melbourne Football Club players
Collingwood Football Club players
Melbourne Football Club (VFA) players
People from North Melbourne